NA-96 Faisalabad-II is a constituency for the National Assembly of Pakistan.

Members of Parliament

2018-2022: NA-102 Faisalabad-II

Election 2002 

General elections were held on 10 Oct 2002. Muhammad Wasi Zafar of PML-Q won by 56,089 votes.

Election 2008 

The result of general election 2008 in this constituency is given below.

Result 
Malik Nawab Sher Waseer succeeded in the election 2008 and became the member of National Assembly.

Election 2013 

General elections were held on 11 May 2013..

Election 2018 
General elections were held on 25 July 2018.

See also
NA-95 Faisalabad-I
NA-97 Faisalabad-III

References

External links
 Election result's official website

NA-076